Astorre III Manfredi (June 20, 1485 – June 9, 1502) was lord Faenza, in northern Italy, from 1488 to 1501.

He was born in Faenza, the son of Galeotto Manfredi. He succeeded his father in the lordship of Faenza in 1488 at the age of three. 

In 1501 he was deposed by Cesare Borgia and sent to Rome. He was assassinated in the Castel Sant'Angelo the following year.

Further reading
 Cecil H. Clough – The Romagna campaign of 1494: a significant military encounter – The French Descent into Renaissance Italy 1494–95: Antecedents and Effects – edited by David Abulafia  – Ashgate –  1995.

Manfredi, Astorre 3
Manfredi, Astorre 3
Astorre 3
Manfredi, Astorre 3